St. Patrick's Marist College (abbreviated as SPMC) is an independent Roman Catholic co-educational secondary day school in the tradition of the Marist Brothers located in Dundas, New South Wales, Australia.

The college was founded by the Marist Brothers as a primary school catering for boys at Harrington Street in The Rocks in 1872. This leaves the college with the distinction of being the oldest school in Australia under the charge of the teaching Brothers and marks it as Australia's first Marist school. It is also one of the nation's oldest Catholic secondary schools. The College moved to its current site in 1962 and as of today, it provides education for approximately 1,000 students from Year 7 to Year 12.

The college is a member of the Association of Marist Schools of Australia (AMSA) and the Metropolitan Catholic Schools. It is administered by the Catholic Education Office of the Diocese of Parramatta.

History

Early days at Harrington Street
Arriving in Sydney on 26 February 1872, the Marist Brothers, led by Brother Ludovic, the founder of the Marist Brothers Province in Australia, established a parish school at St Patrick's, Church Hill. The first St Patrick's was a double storied building in Harrington Street, The Rocks which previously had been St Philip's Anglican School. On 8 April 1872, one hundred and thirty primary boys were enrolled in this first Marist school in Australia. St Patrick's has "the distinction of being the oldest school in Australia under the charge of teaching Brothers". By 1875, Brother Ludovic was also able to open a high school at St Patrick's. This was to be the first popular high school for day boys in NSW since the only secondary schools available at the time were boarding schools.  Over the years, St Patrick's, Church Hill served as a primary school, high school, intermediate school, business college and evening college. The business college continues to this day as Patrick's College Australia, Sydney .

Transition to Dundas
With diminishing numbers of residents in the inner city, it was decided to move the campus to Dundas in 1962 The new site retained much of the traditions and customs of the old St Patrick's, thus forging a strong link with the original school at Harrington Street. A number of students also made the move from Harrington Street to Dundas.

The founding Principal on the Dundas site was Brother Thomas More Davidson. He faced the challenges of setting up the new school with great faith and energy. Despite problems such as bad weather holding up the completion of buildings, 110 boys in Years 4, 5 and 6 commenced classes for Term 1, 1962 in the top floor rooms whilst the builders completed the ground floor. The school was established as a Demonstration Secondary School in 1965 and was named St Patrick's Marist Brothers' Demonstration School. The secondary school, catering for males in Years 7-10 was officially opened on 2 October 1966. The primary school continued at Dundas until 1985 when the last Year 6 class completed their schooling.

1985 marked another historic year for St Patrick's Marist when not only were its first Year 11 students enrolled, but coeducation was introduced in the senior school. The successful transition was built upon the vision and dedication of Principals Brother John O'Brien, Brother William Selden and Brother Ronald Blyth who guided St Patrick's through years of change in response to the needs of the Catholic communities of Dundas and its neighbouring parishes.

The school was renamed St Patrick's Marist College by Brother Michael Procajlo when the first co-educational group was enrolled in Year 7 in 1992.

Recent developments

In 2016, the College implemented a Project-Based Learning approach where students collaborate in groups to create a project using a variety of creative mediums. This encouraged collaboration and teamwork, as well as challenging students further in their learning. In 2021, they also implemented Inquiry-Based Learning to complement the new Inquiry Hubs that were recently constructed. This approach works in tandem with PBL and encourages students to look at problems in a deeper way by independently and collaboratively inquiring using research rather than being directly told the answers by the teachers.

Campus
The school is located on the corner of Kirby Street and Kissing Point Road in Dundas, a suburb of Sydney. Its main entrance is located on Kirby Street. The college is centred on the Harrington Courtyard, named in honour of the original locale of the school in The Rocks. There are three main ovals and two basketball/netball courts located to the north of the IT wing. The school also contains a covered Senior Yard area, where students from Years 11 and 12 sit at break periods. A new information technology wing was completed a few years ago, and a new multi-purpose centre was also built up near the basketball courts (La Valla Centre). The music centre was refurbished with the addition of a new classroom. In 2020, the original building of the college was demolished to make way for a large new 3 storey building, with state of the art classrooms and learning spaces. A new library was also constructed that year.

Extracurricular and special programs
The school is involved in a number of co-curricular activities. These include:

Representative sport (MCS and MCCS)
College sports program, swimming classes & surf lifesaving classes
Debating and public speaking (CSDA)
College musicals
First Aid course
Chess tournaments
Marist Oratory
National competitions
Annual ski trips
Marist solidarity programs
International excursions
The college has a sister school: Marist Nursery and Primary School in Viyalanmedu, Trichy. Every year, students organise a walkathon to raise money for this school. The College funded the entire construction of the now thriving preschool from just a slab in the ground. They also visit the school every year to serve the local community and be immersed in their culture.

Students
There are approximately 1000 students enrolled at St Patrick's Marist College. Upon enrolment at the college, students are divided amongst six homeroom groups: Chavoin (Jeanne Marie Chavoin), Edwin (Brother Edwin Farrell), Ludovic (St Ludovic), Mackillop (Mary MacKillop), Paul (St Paul) and Xavier (Francis Xavier).

The Student Representative Council (SRC)
Students have the option of involvement in the Student Representative Council (SRC). The student council includes class captains from all years, Junior Captains from Year 9, and College Captains from Year 12.  The student council helps to promote student welfare and organise popular social and sporting events, as well as assist the College Leadership Team in developing College programs. House captains are selected by their Year 11 peers and are responsible for the six house groups' involvement in the college's swimming and athletics carnivals.

Academics 
The college has a history of great performance in the HSC. It commonly ranks within the top 150 schools in NSW, with many distinguished achievers and all-rounders each year. The college offers a Gifted and Talented program for new students in Year 7, with accelerated subjects and classes.

High Support Needs Centre 
St Patrick's Marist College is also home to ‘Wiyanga’, a purpose-built state-of-the-art facility that offers students with High Support Needs an alternate platform for learning and inclusion in Catholic Education Diocese of Parramatta system of schools. College students are allowed to visit the students every day during breaks to talk and have fun.

See also 
 List of Catholic schools in New South Wales
 Catholic education in Australia

References

External links 
 The St Patrick's Marist College official website
 Catholic Education - Diocese of Parramatta: School Profile of St Patrick's Marist College.

Educational institutions established in 1872
Roman Catholic Diocese of Parramatta
Catholic secondary schools in Sydney
Association of Marist Schools of Australia
1872 establishments in Australia